Cape Dorset Airport  is located at Kinngait (formerly Cape Dorset), Nunavut, Canada, and is operated by the Government of Nunavut.

Turbo-prop aircraft are used and handled at this airport due to the runway surface and length.

Airlines and destinations

References

External links

Cape Dorset airport information

Certified airports in the Qikiqtaaluk Region